The Moore Ministry was a ministry of the Government of Queensland and was led by Country and Progressive National Party (CPNP) Premier Arthur Edward Moore. It succeeded the McCormack Ministry on 21 May 1929, ten days after William McCormack's Labor government was defeated at the 1929 state election. The ministry was followed by the Forgan Smith Ministry on 18 June 1932 after the CPNP were defeated by Labor at the 1932 state election a week earlier.

On 21 May 1929, the Governor, Sir John Goodwin, designated 10 principal executive offices of the Government, and appointed the following Members of the Legislative Assembly of Queensland to the Ministry as follows:

 The role of Secretary for Railways was restyled Minister for Transport on 28 January 1932.

References
 
 
 

Queensland ministries